The Keep (1995) is the tenth album by American singer-songwriter Happy Rhodes.

Overview

A compilation of acoustic versions of previously released songs, and rarities 1984–1995.

Track listing

All music, lyrics, voices, instruments and arrangements - Happy Rhodes (except as noted in credits)

 "Temporary And Eternal" - 5:33
 "Life On Mars" - 3:20
 "Collective Heart" - 4:45
 "The Yes Medley" - 6:05
 "Save Our Souls" - 6:00
 "Flash Me Up" - 2:14
 "For We Believe" - 2:34
 "Summer" - 3:28
 "Oh Holy Night" - 3:27
 "Look For The Child" - 4:20
 "Hold Me" - 3:25
 "Bye Moon" - 2:07
 "Prey Of The Strange" - 3:36
 "Oh Hand Of Mine" - 3:49

Album Produced by Kevin Bartlett.
Individual songs Produced by
Happy Rhodes
Happy Rhodes and Kevin Bartlett
John Diliberto
Bruce Raines
John Patoubas

Personnel
Happy Rhodes:
Vocals, Nylon Guitar, Acoustic Guitar
Kevin Bartlett:
Electric Guitar, Loops, Effects
Carl Adami:
Bass, Devices
Dean Sharp:
Percussion
Kelly Bird:
Backing vocals, Acoustic Guitar

"The Yes Medley":
"I Sleep Alone" written by Trevor Rabin. Published by Uni/Chappell Music, Warnell Chappell Music
"Soon" written by Jon Anderson. Published by Topographic Music BMI
"Endless Dream" written by Trevor Rabin, Jon Anderson. Published by Tremander's Songs BMI and Fizz Music Ltd., Warner Bros. Music Corp. ASCAP
"Hearts" written by Jon Anderson, Trevor Rabin, Chris Squire, Alan White, Tony Kaye. Published by Affirmative Music BMI

References 

Happy Rhodes albums
1995 compilation albums